Francis Vincent Vennera (March 27, 1947 – July 7, 2021) was an American actor, known for his role as Joe Mondragon, in Robert Redford's The Milagro Beanfield War, among other movies. He also often served as a voice double for Joe Pesci.

Acting

Vennera served in the United States Army during the Vietnam War, first in the Signal Corps and later in the Special Services division. After which, he embarked on a career as an actor and dancer. He was also a musician, playing several instruments. Vennera's first acting role of note was in the Broadway production of Grease, having toured with the musical for a year. He continued working as a performer, and appeared in the 1978 film Thank God It's Friday, where he performed a dance routine on top of several cars. His acting career continued throughout the 1980s, and 1990s, appearing in many films and television series. In 1979, Vennera appeared as Vietnam War veteran Mitch Costigan in three episodes of Vega$, alongside Vega$ star Robert Urich. In 1989, he appeared in three episodes of The Golden Girls as the character Enrique Mas.

Vennera also ventured into doing voice acting in the 1980s, with roles on Hanna-Barbera programs. However, his most notable role was Pesto on Warner Bros. Animation/Amblin Entertainment's hit animated series Animaniacs. Prior to his death, Vennera also taught acting.

Personal life
Vennera died from cancer at his home in Burbank, California, on July 7, 2021, at the age of 74.

Selected filmography

References

External links
 

1947 births
2021 deaths
20th-century American male actors
American male film actors
American male stage actors
American male television actors
American male voice actors
Deaths from cancer in California
People from Herkimer, New York